"Gettin' Some" (explicitly titled "Gettin' Some Head") is a song by American hip hop recording artist Shawnna. It was released on December 3, 2005, via Disturbing tha Peace/Def Jam Recordings as a single from her second studio album Block Music. The original version of "Gettin' Some" appears on Block Music as a hidden track. The song samples Too Short's "Blowjob Betty".

The radio edit of the song features rapper Ludacris. The song is a reference to oral sex as the rappers tell in the song's chorus about receiving oral sex from women. The popularity of the song earned Shawnna her first platinum certification as a solo artist by the Recording Industry Association of America on December 6, 2006. The music video included Chicago model Candy Brooks as the "oohs and aahs girl".

Remixes
The official remix that can be found on the Block Music album features Too Short, Pharrell Williams, Ludacris and Lil Wayne. Another remix featuring Rick Ross, Pimp C and the same Lil' Wayne verse can be found on the official Disturbing tha Peace mixtape The DTP Takeover: Its An Epidemic. An extended remix was released on Shawnna's mixtape Block Party - The Mixtape featuring all the artists from the previous remixes, along with Dre of Cool & Dre, Shawn J of Field Mob, Pitbull, Fat Joe, Twista, Busta Rhymes and Jim Jones. Busta Rhymes' verse from this remix is taken from the mixtape freestyle he did over the beat with his artist Labba. Along with providing a verse for the official remix, Lil Wayne also recorded new verses to the instrumental on his 2006 mixtape Dedication 2. This version featured Pharrell's verse from the official remix.

Track listing

Charts

Weekly charts

Year-end charts

Certifications

References

External links

2005 songs
2005 singles
Shawnna songs
Obscenity controversies in music
Songs written by Too Short
Songs written by Shawnna